Generic Stream Encapsulation, or GSE for short, is a Data link layer protocol defined by DVB. GSE provides means to carry packet oriented protocols such as IP on top of uni-directional physical layers such as DVB-S2, DVB-T2 and DVB-C2.

GSE provides additional features beyond the pure carriage of IP datagrams that increase the protocol flexibility and applicability. Some key GSE functions/characteristics are:
 Support for multi-protocol encapsulation (IPv4, IPv6, MPEG, ATM, Ethernet, 802.1pQ VLANs, etc.)
 Transparency to network layer functions, including IP encryption and IP header compression.
 Support of several addressing modes. In addition to the 6-byte MAC address (including multicast and unicast), it supports a MAC address-less mode, and an optional 3-byte address mode.
 A mechanism for fragmenting IP datagrams or other network layer packets over Base Band frames to support ACM/VCM.
 Support for hardware filtering.
 Extensibility: additional link protocols can be included through specific protocol type values (e.g. Layer 2 security, IP Header Compression, etc.).

Protocol Outline 

The protocol specification has been published as ETSI TS
102 606. An accompanying implementation guidelines
document has been published as ETSI TS 102 771.

IP datagrams, Ethernet Frames, or other network layer packets are encapsulated in one or more GSE Packets. The encapsulation process adds control information such as the network protocol type and address label, and provides an overall integrity check when needed.

The payload frame may be encapsulated in a single GSE Packet or sliced into fragments and encapsulated in several GSE Packets. GSE Packets have in general variable length, in order to match the input IP traffic with minimum overhead.

GSE Packets may be sent in different Base Band frames, not necessarily consecutive or with the same transmission parameters (modulation format, coding rate). No constraint on the GSE Packet position within the Base Band frame is assumed. However, GSE Packets may not be reordered between the encapsulator and the de-encapsulator. In general, a Base Band frame can contain more than a single GSE Packet. Base Band frames may have fixed, or variable length.

GSE does not provide a mechanism for integrity check of single GSE Packet. A CRC-32 is only appended to the last fragment of a fragmented payload to verify the correctness of the reassembly operation. GSE relies on the physical layer being able to ensure the required error detection and/or correction probability.

GSE Header 

The GSE Packet header is highly dynamic and provides for many options. The minimum header is two bytes, comprising three flags fields, and a 12-bit payload length field. The diagram below shows all possible fields.

Fragmentation and Reassembly 

The basic mechanism of GSE payload fragmentation uses the Start and End Flags, where the Start flag indicates the beginning of a payload frame, and the End flag indicates its end. This is shown in the diagram below.

On DVB-S2, DVB-T2, and DVB-C2 the ACM/VCM modes may cause the Base Band frames to vary in size depending on the transmission conditions. Hence there may be situations where the first fragments of a payload frame have been sent, but the encapsulator is forced to set aside the current payload frame, and start working on a new one. This may e.g. occur when large fragments have been prepared while transmission conditions were fine, but suddenly the conditions deteriorate, and only small Base Band frames are available.

This is when the Fragment ID field becomes important. It is a short-term identification of the payload frame. Whenever the encapsulator needs to move on to the next payload frame, without having finished transmitting the previous one, it uses the next available Fragment ID. That way, up to 256 payload frames can be "kept open" at any time. The decapsulator uses the Fragment ID to pick the reassembly buffer in which to store the fragment.

GSE addresses 

The "Label Type" (LT) bits determine how the GSE packet address is encoded according to the following table:

CRC-32 Trailer 

Each GSE Packet containing the last fragment for a payload frame, carries a CRC-32 checksum over the payload frame. The checksum is used to detect loss of intermediate fragments.

The checksum is a 32 bit value calculated according to the generator polynomial represented by 0x104C11DB7:

If the last fragment of a payload frame is lost, the decapsulator can not directly detect that fact. It never sees the GSE frame with the End flag set and containing the CRC-32. For this situation, the decapsulator must choose a suitable time-out based on the data-rate and application.

GSE Implementations

Products Supporting GSE 

Since GSE packets are directly inserted into base-band frames of the
modulation scheme, GSE products come in the form of "GSE Routers" or
"GSE Modems", which - from the outside - act very much like a DSL
Router or DSL Modem used by consumers. More generically these devices
are also referred to as "GSE Encapsulators". These products have a standard
IP network interface (most often Ethernet or a similar LAN
interface) to collect IP traffic which is to be forwarded over the
uni-directional link on the other end. To optimise the packaging into
base-band frames, these devices typically generate complete base-band
frames with the GSE packets as payload, which are then transferred to
the DVB-S2, DVB-T2 or DVB-C2 modulator through a second
interface.

Here is a (very likely incomplete) list of GSE en- and decapsulators:
 Newtec
 EL470 IP Satellite Modem
 EL970 IP Satellite Demodulator
 WORK Microwave GmbH
 Challenge Series Satellite High Speed DVB-S2 IP Modem SK-IP
 Tebkom GmbH
 ODG200 IP/DVB-S2 Encapsulator/Modulator with ACM support
 Advantech Wireless Inc.
 AMT 75e DVB-S/S2 High Speed Broadcast Modem
 Comtech EF Data Corporation
 CDM-840 Remote Router
 K.S.Transplaneta Ltd.
 dpi4502 DVB2 (S2/T2/C2) compliant IPv4 / IPv6 Encapsulator
 Computer Modules, Inc.
 DVB Rocket™/S2
 Ayecka Communication systems LTD
SR1 - Advance DVB-S2 demodulator with hardware based, wire speed, GSE Decapsulator
ST1 - Advance DVB-S2 modulator with hardware based, wire speed, GSE encapsulator
SM1 - Advance DVB-S2 Modem with hardware based, wire speed, GSE EnCapsulator / DeCapsulator

GSE-based IP Service Offerings 

There are many IP-over-satellite service offerings, including for
instance ASTRA2Connect from SES or Tooway from
Eutelsat. Little detail is however known about the protocols used
since the receivers are provided as part of the service by the
operators and very little technical detail is disclosed.

References

External links 
 Obtain GSE Standard and Guidelines from DVB free of charge
 DVB Fact Sheet on GSE
 GSE project home page at ESA
 Opensource implementation of GSE

Television technology
Link protocols